São Julião de Moreira is a 162 kg meteorite found in Moreira do Lima, Ponte de Lima, Portugal.

History
The meteorite was found in 1877. The fall was not observed, but was dated to 770,000 years ago. It is a single meteorite, with a mass of 162 kg, almost spherical in shape and about 35 cm in diameter, which was later divided into many pieces. It was covered with a thick layer of rust and buried in an agricultural land at Quinta das Cruzes, 1.2 meters deep, when the land was being prepared for planting vines.

Composition and classification
It is a octahedrite.

References

Meteorites found in Portugal
1877 in Portugal
1877 in science